Boston is  the capital and most populous city of the Commonwealth of Massachusetts.

Boston may also refer to:

Places

Canada 
 Boston, Ontario
 Boston Township, Ontario

Ireland 
 Boston, County Clare
 Boston, County Laois, a townland in County Laois

Kyrgyzstan 
 Boston, Nooken, a village in Nooken District, Jalal-Abad Region
 Boston, Suzak, a village in Suzak District, Jalal-Abad Region
 Boston, Osh, a village in Özgön District, Osh Region

United Kingdom 
 Boston, Lincolnshire, England
 Boston (UK Parliament constituency), a former parliamentary borough
 Borough of Boston
 Boston Spa, West Yorkshire, England

United States 
 Boston, Alabama, a former name of West Greene
 Boston, Georgia
 Boston, Indiana
 Boston, Kentucky
 Boston, Louisville, a neighborhood in Louisville, Kentucky
 Boston, Missouri
 Boston, New York
 Boston, Belmont County, Ohio
 Boston, Highland County, Ohio
 Boston, Licking County, Ohio
 Boston, Summit County, Ohio
 Boston, Pennsylvania
 Boston, Texas
 Boston, Accomack County, Virginia
 Boston, Culpeper and Rappahannock Counties, Virginia
 Boston Mountains, in Arkansas and Oklahoma
 Boston Township (disambiguation)

Uzbekistan 
 Boʻston, a town in Karakalpakstan
 Boʻston, Jizzakh Region, a town in Jizzakh Region

Elsewhere 
 Boston, South Australia, Australia
 Boston, Belize
 Boston, a neighborhood in Medellín, Colombia
 Ebon Atoll or Boston, Marshall Islands
 Boston, Davao Oriental, Philippines
 Boston, KwaZulu-Natal, South Africa
 Boston, Suriname

People
 Boston (surname)
 Boston Charley, a warrior in the Modoc War of 1872
 Boston Corbett (1832–presumed dead 1894), the Union soldier who shot Abraham Lincoln's assassin John Wilkes Booth
 Boston Scott (born 1995), American National Football League player
 Boston (Hasidic dynasty), a Hasidic dynasty founded in Boston in the early 20th century

Arts and entertainment

Fictional characters 
 Boston Arliss Crab, a fictional character from the TV series Blindspot
 Boston Blackie, a fictional character in literature, films, radio and television
 "Boston Brand", real name of the comics character Deadman
Boston Low, a NASA commander and protagonist of graphic adventure game The Dig

Games 
 Boston (card game), an 18th-century card game
 Eight-ball or Boston, a pocket billiards game
 Boston, winning or bidding to win every trick in a round of Bid whist

Music 
 Boston (band)
 Boston (album)
 "Boston" (song), a song by Augustana

Other arts and entertainment 
 Boston (dance), a number of waltz-type dances
 Boston (novel), a 1928 work by Upton Sinclair
 "Boston", an unaired episode of Aqua Teen Hunger Force

Schools

United Kingdom 
 Boston College (England)
 Boston Grammar School, a state school in England
 Boston High School, a state school in England

United States 
 Boston College, a private Jesuit university in Chestnut Hill, Massachusetts
 Boston Conservatory at Berklee, a music conservatory
 Boston University, a private secular university

Ships 
 , various US Navy ships
 Boston, a historical ship in British Columbia

Sports 
 Boston Bears (AFL), a team that competed in AFL III in 1940
 Boston Braves/Boston Redskins, now the Washington Commanders 
 Boston Breakers
 Boston Breakers (USFL) or Portland Breakers
 Boston Bruins, one of the original six National Hockey League teams
 Boston Bulldogs (AFL), a team that competed in AFL I in 1926
 Boston Celtics, a professional basketball team competing in NBA
 Boston City League, a high school athletic conference in Massachusetts
 Boston Patriots, a member of AFL IV (1960-1969) that currently competes in the National Football League as the New England Patriots
 Boston Red Sox, a Major League Baseball team based in Boston, Massachusetts
 Boston Shamrocks (AFL), a team that won the AFL II championship in 1936
 Boston United F.C., a Conference North football team based in Boston, Lincolnshire, England
 Boston Yanks, a National Football League team from 1944 to 1948
 Boston (horse), an American racehorse

Other uses 
 .boston, top-level Internet domain for Boston
 A-20 Boston, a World War II-era light bomber and night fighter made by the Douglas Aircraft Company
 Boston Manor, a Jacobean house in West London, United Kingdom
 Boston Camera, a type of camera
 Boston Consulting Group, a large management consulting organisation
 Boston (magazine), a monthly publication about life in the Greater Boston (Massachusetts) area
 Boston Magazine (1783–1786)
 Boston, a brand of piano designed by Steinway & Sons
 Boston, the Microsoft pre-release codename for Microsoft Visual Studio 97
 "Boston the Bear", a geographic Beanie Baby honoring the city of Boston

See also 
 Bostan (disambiguation)
 Boston Common
 Boston Harbor
 Boston Store (disambiguation)
 Bostonian (disambiguation)
 Greater Boston, a conurbation centered on Boston, Massachusetts
 New Boston (disambiguation)
 SS City of Boston, an ocean liner which disappeared without a trace in 1870